The 2015–16 South Dakota Coyotes women's basketball represented University of South Dakota in the 2015–16 NCAA Division I women's basketball season. The Coyotes, led by fourth-year head by Amy Williams, played their home games at the DakotaDome and were members of Summit League. They finished the season 32–6, 15–1 in Summit League play to win the Summit League regular season title. They advanced to the championship of the Summit League women's tournament where they lost to their in-state rival South Dakota State. They received an automatic trip to the Women's National Invitation Tournament, where they advanced to the championship game, defeating Florida Gulf Coast.

On April 11, 2016, Amy Williams resigned her position at South Dakota to accept the head coaching position at Nebraska. She finished at South Dakota with a 4-year record of 96–44.

This was the final season for South Dakota women's basketball at the DakotaDome. The Coyotes women's basketball, men's basketball, and women's volleyball teams now play in the Sanford Coyote Sports Center, which opened in August 2016.

Roster

Schedule

|-
!colspan=9 style="background:#E34234; color:#FFFFFF;"| Non-conference regular season

|-
!colspan=9 style="background:#E34234; color:#FFFFFF;"| The Summit League regular season

|-
!colspan=9 style="background:#E34234; color:#FFFFFF;"| The Summit League Women's Tournament

|-
!colspan=9 style="background:#E34234; color:#FFFFFF;"| WNIT

Rankings

References

See also
2015–16 South Dakota Coyotes men's basketball team

South Dakota Coyotes women's basketball seasons
South Dakota State
2016 Women's National Invitation Tournament participants
Women's National Invitation Tournament championship seasons
Coy
Coy